The In Crowd may refer to:

Film
 The In Crowd (1988 film), a 1960s period drama directed by Mark Rosenthal
 The In Crowd (2000 film), a teen thriller directed by Mary Lambert

Sports
 The In Crowd (wrestling), a World Wrestling Entertainment tag team consisting of John Morrison and The Miz

Music
 The In-Crowd (British band), later known as Tomorrow, a 1960s English psychedelic rock band
The In Crowd, 60s collective in association with duo Jon & Robin
The In Crowd, another 60s group also known as Eternal Flame and The Eligibles
 The In Crowd (Jamaican band), a 1970s reggae band

Albums
 The In Crowd (Ramsey Lewis album), 1965
 The In Crowd (Kidz in the Hall album), 2008

Songs
 "The 'In' Crowd" (song), a 1964 song by Dobie Gray, written by Billy Page
"The In Crowd", song by Cal Smith written by Jerry McBee & Fred Lehner 1977, covered by John Conlee 1979
 "The In Crowd", a song by John Hampson of Nine Days (band)

 "The In Crowd" a 2009 song by American actor and singer, Mitchel Musso